José Ribeiro Simões Costa (15 June 1913 – 19 July 1944), known as Simões, was a Portuguese footballer who played as a right-back.

Club career
Simões spent his entire career with C.F. Os Belenenses, always in the Primeira Liga. He was part of the squad that won the 1941–42 Taça de Portugal.

Simões died on 19 July 1944, aged 31.

International career
Simões won 10 caps for Portugal over five years. He made his debut on 26 January 1936, in a 3–2 friendly defeat against Austria held in Porto.

On 28 November 1937, before the start of another exhibition game, against Spain in Vigo, Simões, as well as teammates Mariano Amaro, João Azevedo and Artur Quaresma, refused to perform the fascist salute, being subsequently questioned by PIDE.

See also
List of one-club men

References

External links

1913 births
1944 deaths
Portuguese footballers
Association football defenders
Primeira Liga players
C.F. Os Belenenses players
Portugal international footballers